Peter Nielsen Ladefoged (17 September 1925 – 24 January 2006) was a British linguist and phonetician.

He was Professor of Phonetics at University of California, Los Angeles (UCLA), where he taught from 1962 to 1991. His book A Course in Phonetics is a common introductory text in phonetics, and The Sounds of the World's Languages (co-authored with Ian Maddieson) is widely regarded as a standard phonetics reference. Ladefoged also wrote several books on the phonetics of African languages. Prior to UCLA, he was a lecturer at the universities of Edinburgh, Scotland (1953–59, 1960–1) and Ibadan, Nigeria (1959–60).

Early life
Peter Ladefoged was born on 17 September 1925, in Sutton (then in Surrey, now in Greater London), England. He attended Haileybury College from 1938 to 1943, and Gonville and Caius College, Cambridge, Cambridge University from 1943 to 1944. He received an MA (1951) and a PhD (1959) in Phonetics from the University of Edinburgh in 1959.

Career
Ladefoged was involved with the phonetics laboratory at UCLA, which he established in 1962. He also was interested in listening to and describing every sound used in spoken human language, which he estimated at 900 consonants and 200 vowels. This research formed the basis of much of The Sounds of the World's Languages. In 1966 Ladefoged moved from the UCLA English Department to join the newly established Linguistics Department.

While at UCLA, Ladefoged was hired as a consultant on the movie My Fair Lady. He wrote the transcriptions that can be seen in Professor Higgins's notebook, and his voice was used in the scenes where Higgins describes vowel pronunciation.

Ladefoged was also a member of the International Phonetic Association for a long time, and was President of the Association from 1986 to 1991. He was deeply involved in maintaining its International Phonetic Alphabet, and was the principal mover of the 1989 International Phonetic Association Kiel Convention. He was also editor of the Journal of the International Phonetic Association. Ladefoged served on the board of directors of the Endangered Language Fund since its inception.

Ladefoged was a founding member of the Association for Laboratory Phonology.

Personal life
Ladefoged married Jenny MacDonald in 1953, a marriage which lasted over 50 years. They had three children: Lise Friedman, a bookseller; Thegn Ladefoged, archaeologist and professor of anthropology at University of Auckland; and Katie Ladefoged, attorney and public defender, residing in Nashville, Tennessee. He also had five grandchildren Zelda Ladefoged, Ethan Friedman, Amy Friedman, Joseph Weiss, and Catherine Weiss.

On May 5, 1970, Ladefoged was arrested and suffered injuries from police while participating in an anti–Vietnam War protest at UCLA. He was initially charged with failure to disperse, but the charge was later changed to assault on a police officer. He was acquitted in the first trial.

Death
Ladefoged died on 24 January 2006 at the age of 80 in hospital in London, England after a research trip to India. He was on his way home to Los Angeles, California from his research trip.

Academic timeline
 1953–55: Assistant Lecturer in Phonetics, University of Edinburgh
 1955–59: Lecturer in Phonetics, University of Edinburgh
 1959–60: Lecturer in Phonetics, University of Ibadan, Nigeria
 1960–61: Lecturer in Phonetics, University of Edinburgh
 1961–62: Field fellow, Linguistic Survey of West Africa, Nigeria
 Summer 1960: University of Michigan
 Summer 1961: Royal Institute of Technology, [Kungliga Tekniska högskolan or KTH], (Stockholm, Sweden)
 1962–63: Assistant Professor of Phonetics, Department of English, UCLA
 1962: Established, and directed until 1991, the UCLA Phonetics Laboratory
 1963–65: Associate Professor of Phonetics, Department of Linguistics], UCLA
 1965–91: Professor of Phonetics, Department of Linguistics, UCLA
 1977–80: Chair, Department of Linguistics, UCLA
 1991: "retired" to become UCLA Research Linguist, Distinguished Professor of Phonetics Emeritus
 2005: Leverhulme Professor, University of Edinburgh
 2005–06: Adjunct professor at the University of Southern California (USC)

Academic honours
 Fellow of the Acoustical Society of America
 Fellow of the American Speech and Hearing Association
 Distinguished Teaching Award, UCLA 1972
 President, Linguistic Society of America, 1978
 President of the Permanent Council for the Organization of International Congresses of Phonetic Sciences, 1983–1991
 President, International Phonetic Association, 1987–1991
 UCLA Research Lecturer 1989
 Fellow of the American Academy of Arts and Sciences 1990
 UCLA College of Letters and Science Faculty Research Lecturer 1991
 Gold medal, XIIth International Congress of Phonetic Sciences 1991
 Corresponding Fellow of the British Academy 1992
 Honorary D.Litt., University of Edinburgh, 1993
 Foreign Member, Royal Danish Academy of Sciences and Letters, 1993
 Silver medal, Acoustical Society of America 1994
 Corresponding Fellow, Royal Society of Edinburgh, 2001
 Honorary D.Sc. Queen Margaret University, Edinburgh, 2002

Selected publications
  Monograph supplement to Revista do Laboratório de Fonética Experimental da Faculdade de Letras da Universidade de Coimbra(Journal of Experimental Phonetics Laboratory of the Faculty of Arts, University of Coimbra).
  Paperback edition 1971. Translation into Japanese, Taishukan Publishing Company, 1976. Second edition, with added chapters on computational phonetics 1996.
  Reprinted 1968.
 
 
 
  2nd ed 1982, 3rd ed. 1993, 4th ed. 2001, 5th ed. Boston: Thomson/Wadsworth 2006, 6th ed. 2011 (co-author Keith Johnson) Boston: Wadsworth/Cengage Learning. Japanese translation 2000.
 
  2001, 2nd ed. 2004.

Works involved in or about
 George Cukor (director), Alan Jay Lerner (lyricist): My Fair Lady. Motion picture film. (1964).

References

External links
 
 Peter Ladefoged's home page at UCLA
 Remembering Peter Ladefoged

1925 births
2006 deaths
People from Sutton, London
Linguists from England
Phoneticians
Speech perception researchers
People educated at Haileybury and Imperial Service College
Alumni of the University of Edinburgh
Academics of the University of Edinburgh
University of California, Los Angeles faculty
British expatriates in Nigeria
Academic staff of the University of Ibadan
Linguists of Eskaleut languages
Linguists of Muskogean languages
Linguistic Society of America presidents
Corresponding Fellows of the British Academy
20th-century linguists
Fellows of the Royal Society of Edinburgh